Schistostege is a genus of moths in the family Geometridae erected by Jacob Hübner in 1825.

Species
Schistostege decussata (Denis & Schiffermüller, 1775)
Schistostege nubilaria (Hübner, 1799)

References

Chesiadini